Montearagón, Montaragón or Monte-Aragón ("Mount of Aragon") can refer to the following places and sites: 

 Castle of Montearagón near Huesca, Aragon
 Mancha de Montearagón, a historic comarca in La Mancha region, Castile-La Mancha
 Montearagón, Toledo, Castile-La Mancha
 Chinchilla de Monte-Aragón in Albacete, Castile-La Mancha